Huampo or Wamp'u (Quechua for boat, also spelled Huanpu) is a mountain in the Cordillera Negra in the Andes of Peru which reaches a height of approximately . It is located in the Ancash Region, Huaylas Province, Pamparomas District, and in the Yungay Province, Quillo District.

References

Mountains of Peru
Mountains of Ancash Region